In architecture, a wedding-cake style is an informal reference to buildings with many distinct tiers, each set back from the one below, resulting in a shape like a wedding cake, and may also apply to buildings that are richly ornamented, as if made in sugar icing. 

In Italy, the Monument to Vittorio Emanuele II is in wedding cake style. 
The British wedding-cake style was created by Sir Christopher Wren, who often placed a steeple at the top of a series of classically detailed diminishing lower stages as with St. Paul's Cathedral. 
In the United States, the style has been predominant in New York City, thanks to the 1916 Zoning Resolution, a former zoning code which forced buildings to reduce their shadows at street level by employing setbacks, resulting in a ziggurat profile. Many iconic New York buildings in the Art Deco style were designed to comply with these zoning regulations, and those designs were highly influential on building projects in other cities. The wedding cake design subsequently became a common feature of many Art Deco buildings around the world. The dome of the United States Capitol in Washington, D.C. is also described as being of wedding-cake style.
In Russia, the wedding-cake style supercharged with boldly scaled classical detailing is a typical feature of Stalinist architecture.

References

Architectural styles